Henry Willis (1821–1901) was an English organ builder.

Henry Willis may also refer to:

 Henry Willis (politician) (1860–1950), Australian politician
 Henry Brittan Willis (1810–1884), English painter of landscapes
 Henry Parker Willis (1874–1937), American financial expert
 Henry Willis (cricketer) (1841–1926), English cricketer

See also 
 Henry Willis & Sons, British pipe organ building company
 Harry Albert Willis, Canadian politician